Sinograptidae is an extinct family of graptolites.

Genera
List of genera from Maletz (2014):

†Allograptus Mu, 1957
†Anomalograptus Clark, 1924
†Atopograptus Harris, 1926
†Brachiograptus Harris & Keble, 1932
†Hemiholmograptus Hsü & Chao, 1976
†Holmograptus Kozłowski, 1954
†Nicholsonograptus Bouček & Přibyl, 1951
†Paradidymograptus Mu, Geh & Yin, 1962 in Mu et al. (1962)
†Pseudodichograptus Chu, 1965
†Pseudojanograptus Hsü & Chao, 1976
†Pseudologanograptus Hsü & Chao, 1976
†Pseudotetragraptus Hsü & Chao, 1976
†Sinazygograptus Wang & Wu, 1977 in Wang & Jin (1977)
†Sinograptus Mu, 1957
†Tylograptus Mu, 1957
†Zygograptus Harris & Thomas, 1941

References

Graptolites
Prehistoric hemichordate families